Hidden Loot is a 1925 American silent Western film directed by Robert North Bradbury and written by Harry Dittmar. The film stars Jack Hoxie, Olive Hasbrouck, Edward Cecil, Jack Kenny, Buck Connors and Bert De Marc. The film was released on October 31, 1925, by Universal Pictures.

Cast  
 Jack Hoxie as Cranner
 Olive Hasbrouck as Anna Jones
 Edward Cecil as Dick Jones
 Jack Kenny as 'Big Bill' Angus
 Buck Connors as Buck
 Bert De Marc as Manning
 Charles Brinley as Jordan

References

External links
 

1925 films
1925 Western (genre) films
American black-and-white films
1920s English-language films
Universal Pictures films
Films directed by Robert N. Bradbury
Silent American Western (genre) films
1920s American films